Bulahdelah  is a town and locality in the Hunter/Mid North Coast region of New South Wales, Australia in the Mid-Coast Council local government area. At the 2016 census, the locality had a population of 1,424. The main population centre, where 69% of the area's population lived in 2006, is the town of Bulahdelah.

Geography
The eastern sector of the township is built on the foot of the Alum Mountain. Leading into the town from the south is the Bulahdelah Bridge which forms part of the Pacific Highway.

History
The  mountain on which the south-eastern sector of the township is built was first named by the Aboriginal people of the area, the Worimi. They called their mountain "Boolah Dillah" (meaning: the Great Rock). In 1818 John Oxley, a crown surveyor added the word "Mountain" to its original name.  The mountain is widely known by its long-term nickname, "the Alum Mountain", but is officially registered as Bulahdelah Mountain.

After the discovery of alunite on the mountain, the mountain was mined from 1878 to 1927, and was managed by the Department of Mining from 1897 onwards. A refinery "The Alum Works" was created to facilitate the extraction of alum from the mined alunite. Another period of mining was then again from 1934 to 1952. Decreasing profitability meant mining had ceased by 1952 and in 1979 NSW State Forests took over management of the mountain.

Construction of the timber bridge across the Myall River was completed in 1892 and the bridge was formally opened on 28 July 1892. A 2-lane concrete bridge over Myall River was completed in 1969.

In 1970 the Bulahdelah tornado swept through the nearby forests, just north of Bulahdelah in what was Australia's most destructive tornado on record.

On 3 May 2006 funding was approved (project approval was granted on 11 October 2007) for the relocation of the Bulahdelah section of Pacific Highway, to through the mid-slopes of Bulahdelah (the Alum) Mountain. Major construction of this highway deviation, known as the Bulahdelah Bypass, commenced in August 2010. The bypass was completed in July 2013.

Population
In the 2016 Census, there were 1,424 people in Bulahdelah. 83.8% of people were born in Australia and 91.2% of people spoke only English at home. The most common responses for religion were Anglican 30.3%, Catholic 23.3% and No Religion 21.9%.

Places of interest

The Alum Mountain
Overlooking the town of Bulahdelah, the Alum Mountain provides views of the area from Cabbage Tree Mountain to the coastline. A lookout is accessible via walking trails and car access extends about two thirds of the way up. Abandoned mining equipment from the mining operations up until 1952 is found in parts of the mountain as are blast caves. A disused mining cart trail directly up the mountain (known by the locals as "the trolley track") is part of the heritage mine-site complex.

Cabbage Tree Mountain
An area of State forest, open to tourists for camping and hiking this bushland set of ranges is visible from the town of Bulahdelah and Alum Mountain.

Tops to Myall Heritage Trail
The Tops to Myall Heritage Trail passes through the area surrounding Bulahdelah.

Logging industry
Logging was a traditional industry of Bulahdelah until 1994 when much of the Forestry Commission land was dedicated to National Parks. It still contributed significantly to the economy of Bulahdelah in the early 2000s.

References

External links
 
 

Towns in the Hunter Region
Suburbs of Mid-Coast Council
Towns in New South Wales